Sinotrans Limited (commonly referred to as Sinotrans) is one of the largest logistics companies in China. The business areas of the company include storage and terminal services and trucking and marine transportation.

Operations
Sinotrans operates railway freight connections from four centers in China. The operation centers are in Guangzhou, Shenzhen and Dongguan in Guangdong, and in Changsha, Hunan. The international railway freight network is an implementation of the Belt and Road Initiative. Among the China-Europe express freight train routes is a link between Shenzhen and Duisburg, which travels through Kazakhstan, Russia, Belarus, and Poland. In Southeast Asia, Sinotrans established a service between Shenzhen and Vientiane in December 2021 after the opening of the Boten–Vientiane railway with the newly opened segment also forming a continous railway route between Singapore and Portugal.

History
The company was incorporated in 2002 and listed on the Hong Kong Stock Exchange in 2003 as a vehicle for the core business, assets and staff of the state-owned China National Foreign Trade Transportation (Group) Corporation. In 2009 the company was reorganised together with the China Changjiang National Shipping (Group) Corporation (CSC) to form Sinotrans&CSC Holdings. 

A strategic merger of this new company together with China Merchants Group received approval from the State Council of the People's Republic of China in December 2015, and by April 2017 Sinotrans Limited (and its former subsidiary Sinotrans Shipping) had become direct subsidiaries of China Merchants Group.

See also
List of largest container shipping companies

References

Companies based in Beijing
Companies listed on the Hong Kong Stock Exchange
Government-owned companies of China
Logistics companies of China
H shares
2002 establishments in China

Container shipping companies
Container shipping companies of China